New Westville is an unincorporated community in Preble County, in the U.S. state of Ohio.

History
New Westville was originally called Westville, and under the latter name was platted in 1816. A post office called New Westville was established in 1840, and remained in operation until 1893.

References

Unincorporated communities in Preble County, Ohio
Unincorporated communities in Ohio